Clube Náutico da Ilha de Luanda, short CNIL (Nautical Club of Luanda Island), is a sports club in the city of Luanda, Angola. 

Founded on February 28, 1924, under the name "Nun'Alvares Sports Club" (Clube Desportivo Nun’Alvares), a name it kept until April 11, 1979, when following the order of the secretary of the National Council of Physical Education and Sport of Angola, which stated, that clubs with names related to colonialism should proceed to its replacement, the club had to change his name.

Since its foundation it is the yacht club with most titles in Angola to date.

See also
 Ilha de Luanda

References

Sports clubs in Angola
Yacht clubs in Africa